The National Payment Card System (NSPK)  is an operational and payment clearing house for processing bank card transactions within Russia and the operator of the Mir card payment system.

References

 
Economy of Russia
Government agencies of Russia
Russian entities subject to the U.S. Department of the Treasury sanctions